The results of the 1999 Nepalese general election.

Ilam

Jhapa

Panchthar

Taplejung

References 

Elections in Nepal
1999 elections in Nepal